Johnson Township is an inactive township in Maries County, in the U.S. state of Missouri.

Johnson Township has the name of Thomas Jefferson Johnson, a state legislator.

References

Townships in Missouri
Townships in Maries County, Missouri